Dyschirius cariniceps is a species of ground beetle in the subfamily Scaritinae. It was described by Baudi di Selve in 1864.

References

cariniceps
Beetles described in 1864